The Conservative Party – Alliance of Farmers and Civilians (KP–GPSZ) was a liberal conservative centre party in Hungary.

The party intended to represent the interests of entrepreneurs and businessmen. It supported increasing privatization and minimize the economic role of the state. The KP–GPSZ contested the 1994 parliamentary election with 13 individual candidates and four regional county lists, failing to win a seat. The party disappeared shortly thereafter.

Election results

National Assembly

References

Sources

Agrarian parties in Hungary
Conservative parties in Hungary
Defunct political parties in Hungary
Political parties established in 1993
Political parties disestablished in 1995
1993 establishments in Hungary
1995 disestablishments in Hungary